Senekane is a community council located in the Berea District of Lesotho. Its population in 2006 was 22,262.

Villages
The community of Senekane includes the villages of: 
 
 Ha Fako
 Ha Fako (Ha Sefikeng)
 Ha Fola
 Ha Hlapa
 Ha Hlasa
 Ha Hlekelele
 Ha Janki (Masaleng)
 Ha Keahana
 Ha Kete
 Ha Khabele
 Ha Khalane
 Ha Khohlooa
 Ha Khophola
 Ha Khothule
 Ha Kubere
 Ha Lapisi
 Ha Lebone
 Ha Letela
 Ha Letsipa
 Ha Likobo
 Ha Likotsi
 Ha Liphoto
 Ha Maboeane
 Ha Macheli
 Ha Mafatle
 Ha Makatane
 Ha Makhoebe
 Ha Makhomo
 Ha Malimabe
 Ha Mantai
 Ha Maqabane
 Ha Maritintši
 Ha Matholoana
 Ha Metsing
 Ha Mojela (Sefikeng)
 Ha Mokhehle
 Ha Mokuba
 Ha Molefi
 Ha Molibetsane
 Ha Molungoa
 Ha Monamoleli
 Ha Moratha
 Ha Moroke
 Ha Motolo
 Ha Motšoari
 Ha Mphele
 Ha Mpopo
 Ha Mpusi
 Ha Nchela
 Ha Nkhotho (Sefikeng)
 Ha Nkoebele
 Ha Nqetho
 Ha Ntabejane
 Ha Ntšoeu
 Ha Paape
 Ha Pampiri
 Ha Penya
 Ha Pholoanyane
 Ha Polaki
 Ha Popa
 Ha Rakotsoane
 Ha Ramabele
 Ha Ramahata
 Ha Ramaqopetsa
 Ha Ramatseatsana
 Ha Ramoloi
 Ha Ramontsuoe
 Ha Ramotšo
 Ha Ranthiba
 Ha Rantsane
 Ha Rantsoku
 Ha Rapholo
 Ha Rasunyane
 Ha Salemane
 Ha Saremone
 Ha Seboka
 Ha Sekepe
 Ha Sekete
 Ha Selemo
 Ha Selouoe
 Ha Senekane
 Ha Taaso
 Ha Tau
 Ha Thafeng
 Ha Thebe
 Ha Thotanyane
 Ha Tšitso
 Ha Tumo
 Konkotia
 Liphakoeng
 Litšilong
 Maqakaneng
 Matebeleng
 Matheneng
 Meholaneng
 Mothating
 Papalala
 Qhooeng
 Qhotseng
 Qopo (Ha Majara)
 Romeng
 Sekhalabateng
 Sekhutlong
 Tsitsa and Zenon

References

External links
 Google map of community villages

Populated places in Berea District